Draco and the Malfoys are a wizard rock band founded in Woonsocket, Rhode Island in 2004. The group is composed of half-brothers Brian Ross and Bradley Mehlenbacher, who both perform under the persona of Draco Malfoy from the Harry Potter book series.

Since the band's formation in 2004, they have released five full-length studio albums, one extended play release, and have contributed to four compilation albums.

In late 2013 in an interview with Wizrocklopedia, Brian Ross confirmed that he and Bradley were in the process of making a new album and released a new single called "Cheat to Win".

History

Early career (2004–2005)

Ross and Mehlenbacher originally conceived Draco and the Malfoys as a parody of Harry and the Potters, who were performing at a local house party. In late 2004, Matt Maggiacomo invited the Harry and the Potters to play at an all-Harry Potter show at his Rhode Island home. That night, Maggiacomo made his debut as the Whomping Willows, and his friends, Mehlenbacher and his brother, Brian Ross, played for the first time as Draco and the Malfoys.

ABC News reported that Brian Ross and Bradley Mehlenbacher's "love for the Harry Potter book series is no less than that of the DeGeorge brothers, but Brian and Bradley seem to better recognize the absurdity of the bands, even mocking the idea that Paul and Joe represent two differently aged versions of the popular wizard."

"We look like nothing like Draco Malfoy, and are clearly too old to be going to Hogwarts," said Brian, 32, of he and his brother Bradley, soon to be 27. "So we say that we're Draco from years 19 and 15 at Hogwarts."

Harry Potter fandom and fan conventions (2006–2007)

Ross said in the ABC News story that the mock rivalry between Draco and the Malfoys and Harry and the Potters is all for show. In fact, the Potters and the Malfoys toured together for a month in the summer of 2007 and often collaborate on albums."
It's a catchy concept, two bands portraying the most beloved and hated characters in the Harry Potter series, both celebrating their passion for the fictional wizard world with catchy tunes and kid-friendly rock concerts."

Neither Draco and the Malfoys nor their nemesis Harry and the Potters think of the burgeoning wizard rock community as a joke, or "even as some bastard-dork cousin of indie-rock". The Boston Phoenix reports that: 
Both groups - Draco and the Malfoys and Harry and the Potters - take their efforts quite seriously, especially at this juncture. Amidst the fervor leading up to the release of Harry Potter and the Deathly Hallows, wizard rockers seem to be drawing bigger and better crowds, at every show.

For Draco and the Malfoys, the band is an escape from the humdrum pressures of hipster irony — like the Potters, they’re prone to rocking out in libraries. In this venture, says Ross, he and his band are just a pipeline for Pottermania. “With this, we’re all fans of something much larger,” he says. “Everyone shows up to have a good time, never to be a snob about the music, ever, ever, ever.”

The Boston Phoenix wondered - in spite of fully booked calendars - how long will wizard rock last once there are no new stories to riff on as their musical identity is contingent on the lasting success and popularity of a book series.
Ross sound[ed] almost tearful, in fact, when he professes his faith that the Potter phenomenon will outlast Deathly Hallows. He and his brother have both been in bands where, “if you go four hours away from your hometown, nobody comes to see you.” When the wiz kid is involved, they have a built-in fan base wherever they go. “Our experience with wizard rock has been the best musical experience of our lives,” says Ross. “We don’t really have any interest in stopping at all.”

Recent events and breakup (2008–2011)

Draco and the Malfoys, Tom Riddle and Friends, Whomping Willows  and the Moaning Myrtles played at Wrockstock 2008 at a YMCA summer camp lodge in the Ozark foothills. They released their third studio album, It's A Slytherin World and a compilation album, Anthology of Slytherin Folk Music, in 2009. They have released plans to create a series of extended plays, the first being Draco and the Malfoys Celebrate... Piracy!. In December 2011, Draco and the Malfoys played their last show at the Yule Ball. On December 19, 2011, they posted this message on their Facebook page: "Thank you for making our final two shows this weekend completely amazing. It's been an unbelievably gratifying 6+ years. We've been playing music together our whole lives, and always dreamt of touring and playing together. Thank you all for making our dreams come true. You've given us more awesome times than we ever could have imagined. Here's to all of our futures. Cheers! ♥ Brian & Bradley."

Musical style

Lyrics
Ross and Mehlenbacher write lyrics from Draco's perspective. Thus dressed in Slytherin-themed costumes (green and silver ties), their anti-Potter lyrics – "You may have freed our house elf, and brought doubt to our family name/ but your parents still got toasted by a big, green, glowing flame" – were initially a parody of wizard rock but were met with success and another Harry Potter-themed garage band was born. Draco and the Malfoys write catchy pop songs from the perspective of Harry's rival and tormentor, Draco Malfoy  "My dad's always there to open all my doors / You have to call a Patronus just to catch a glimpse of yours... my dad is rich, and your dad is dead"  goes one chorus. They make reference to various Harry Potter objects, such as the Mirror of Erised and the Patronus Charm. The lyrics are generally mocking and condescending towards Harry, Ron, and others. BostonNOW asked the band if Ross ever had "any anti-fans at your shows?" Ross replied, "Never. Everyone is very supportive, although we will get little kids getting mad and yelling at us because we write songs making fun of Neville and Harry". The Advocate of Stamford, Connecticut reported that:
The pair said they had fun trying to figure out why Draco's so mean, Mehlenbacher said. Their lyrics are written tongue-in-cheek, and all but the very youngest Harry Potter fans seem to understand that.
"Little kids really take it personally," Ross, 32, told the Advocate. "They yell at us."

Influences
The band was inspired by the band Harry and the Potters, who were in turn inspired by the J.K. Rowling book series Harry Potter.

Instrumental
Draco and the Malfoys both play guitar. Brian plays a Fender Stratocaster, and Bradley plays a Fender Telecaster. They are often backed up by a BOSS Dr. Rhythm drum machine (both live and in studio recordings).

Reception

Draco and the Malfoys have toured with Harry and the Potters and both bands usually charge $5 to $10 for tickets to their shows, though some performances are free. Draco and the Malfoys put their songs on Apple's iTunes.

Discography

Studio albums
 Draco and the Malfoys (2005)
 Party Like You're Evil! (2007)
 It's A Slytherin World (2009)
 An Anthology of Slytherin Folk Songs (2009)
 Cheat to Win (2014)

Extended plays
 Family (2007)

See also
 Filk

References

Further reading
Dowling, Tim. Books, films and now gigs: Harry Potter rocks. The Guardian. July 17, 2007.

External links

Bands with fictional stage personas
Family musical groups
Musical groups disestablished in 2011
Musical groups established in 2004
Musical groups reestablished in 2013
Rock music duos
Rock music groups from Rhode Island
Sibling duos
Wizard rock musical groups
Wizard rock